Aaron Jerome, known professionally as Sbtrkt (stylised as SBTRKT; disemvowelment of "subtract"), is an English musician and producer. Sbtrkt has remixed songs by artists such as M.I.A, Radiohead, Modeselektor, Basement Jaxx, Mark Ronson, and Underworld, and has released singles, EPs, and two albums. His music has been playlisted by BBC Radio 1 and BBC Radio 6 Music.

Sbtrkt also has performed live with frequent collaborator Sampha. The live show from 2010 to 2012 consisted of Jerome utilizing synthesisers, keyboards, drums and drum programming with Sampha on vocals and keyboards.

Jerome uses the project's title rather than his own name in order to support the concept of anonymity. Jerome has explained "[I'd] rather not talk about myself as a person, and let the music speak for itself. The name SBTRKT is me taking myself away from that whole process. I'm not a social person, so having to talk to DJs to make them play a record is not something I want to do. It's more about giving them a record as an anonymous person and seeing whether they like it or not. If they play it, they play it."

Sbtrkt wears modern interpretations of native society ceremonial masks designed by the anonymous designer "A Hidden Place".

In March 2016, Sbtrkt announced a new project described as a 'non album'. The collection of songs and project is designed to bring new tracks to fans sooner than album cycles and also be a continuous ongoing experience.

In June 2022, Sbtrkt announced that new music would be released later in the year.

Discography

Studio albums
SBTRKT (27 June 2011)
Wonder Where We Land (7 October 2014)
Save Yourself (24 March 2016)
The Rat Road (5 May 2023)

EPs
2009: Musik Lace
2010: 2020 (Brainmath Records)
2010: Step in Shadows
2014: Transitions I
2014: Transitions II
2014: Transitions III

Other
2009: "LAIKA" (Brainmath Records)
2013: Live (with Sampha) (live album of SBTRKT's self-titled album)
2013: IMO (taken from the Young Turks 2013 Compilation)
2015: 2o15 (free compilation of songs)
2016: Save Yourself (non-album compilation of songs)

Singles
"Break Off/Evening Glow" (with Sampha) (2010) - Ramp Recordings
"Midnight Marauder" (with Sinden) (2010) - Grizzly
"Soundboy Shift" (2010)
"Nervous" (with Jessie Ware) (2010) - Numbers
"Living Like I Do" (feat. Sampha) (2011, 12" Ltd)
"Ready Set Loop / Twice Bitten" (2011, 12" Ltd, Gre) - SBTRKT
"Wildfire" (feat. Little Dragon and Drake) (2011, 12" Ltd)
"Pharaohs" (feat. Roses Gabor) (2011)
"Hold On" (feat. Sampha)  (2012, 12" Ltd)
'"Temporary View" (feat. Sampha) (2014)
"New Dorp. New York." (feat. Ezra Koenig) (2014)
"I Feel Your Pain" (feat. DRAM and Mabel) (2016)
"Bodmin Moor" (2022)
"Miss The Days" (2022)
"Ghost" (feat. LEILAH) (2022)
"Forward" (feat. LEILAH) (2022)

Sbtrkt live members
Sbtrkt – composer, synths, keyboards, drum machines, drums, backing vocals (2010–present)
Sampha – vocals, keyboards, percussion (2010–2013), guest vocalist (2014, 2015)
Jimmy Holdom – drums (2014–present)
Fabiana Palladino – synths, keyboards, percussion (2014–2015)
Tev'n – vocals, synths, keyboards, percussion (2015)

References

External links

 – official site

English electronic musicians
English record producers
Post-dubstep musicians
Living people
Musicians from Cambridgeshire
XL Recordings artists
Masked musicians
Year of birth missing (living people)